James H. "Jum" Sampson (born c. 1876) was a New Zealand-born rugby union player who represented Australia.

Sampson, who was thought to have possibly come from Waihi, played as a number 8.

He may have started his career playing in the Waikato between 1893 and 1895. After returning to where he was believed to have originated from, he spent one season in the Ohinemuri area the next year. During 1897 he joined the Parnell club in Auckland where he made the provincial side the following year. He was understood to have moved to Sydney in 1899 where he joined the Glebe (now known as Drummoyne) club.

Sampson claimed 1 international rugby cap for Australia. This was against Great Britain, at Sydney, on 12 August 1899. He never represented New South Wales and did not play any known first-class rugby after 1899.

References

Australian rugby union players
Australia international rugby union players
Year of birth uncertain
Year of death missing
Rugby union players from Waikato
Rugby union number eights